Route 170 is an -long east–west secondary highway in southwest New Brunswick, Canada.

The route's eastern terminus is at an intersection with Route 127 in Gilmans Corner, New Brunswick. From there, it runs west crossing the Waweig River to the small community of Simpson Corner, New Brunswick. Route 170 then crosses Oak Bay and runs until its terminus in St. Stephen.

History

Route 170 was commissioned in 1984 as a renumbering of the former Route 20, which had existed since 1965. Initially consisting only of Milltown Boulevard, it connected downtown St. Stephen with the smaller Milltown border crossing to the west. It was extended eastward along a former routing of Route 1 to Waweig in 2008.

Intersecting routes
 Route 760 in Simpson Corner
 Route 755 in Oak Bay.
 Route 750 in St. Stephen

River crossings
Waweig River in Gilmans Corner
Oak Bay in Oak Bay

Communities along the Route
 Waweig
 Simpson Corner
 Oak Bay
 Benson Corner
 Dufferin
 St. Stephen

See also
List of New Brunswick provincial highways
 St. Stephen Airport

References

170
170
170
St. Stephen, New Brunswick
1984 establishments in New Brunswick